Wyoming Presbyterian Church is a registered historic building in Wyoming, Ohio, listed in the National Register on March 3, 1980.

The church building was completed May 18, 1890.

Notes 

Churches on the National Register of Historic Places in Ohio
Presbyterian churches in Ohio
Buildings and structures in Wyoming, Ohio
Churches in Hamilton County, Ohio
National Register of Historic Places in Hamilton County, Ohio
Churches completed in 1890
Samuel Hannaford church buildings